The 2006 World Men's Curling Championship was held April 1–9, 2006 at the Tsongas Center at UMass Lowell in Lowell, Massachusetts, United States. Scotland, skipped by David Murdoch, won the tournament defeating Canada in the final.

Teams

*** Finnish skip Markku Uusipaavalniemi missed the first three games with a wrist injury; Kiiskinen skipped in his place. Markku returned April 3; threw second rocks in the early draw and third stones in the remainder of the competition.

Round-robin standings
Scoring for the tournament was done by CurlingZone.com. They calculated the player percentages differently than normal. They used a five-point system with a multiplier for degree of difficulty in shots.

Round-robin results

Draw 1
April 1, 09:00

Draw 2
April 1, 16:00

Draw 3
April 2, 09:00

Draw 4
April 2, 14:00

Draw 5
April 2, 19:00

Draw 6
April 3, 09:00

Draw 7
April 3, 14:00

Draw 8
April 3, 19:00

Draw 9
April 4, 09:00

Draw 10
April 4, 14:00

Draw 11
April 4, 19:00

Draw 12
April 5, 09:00

Draw 13
April 5, 14:00

Draw 14
April 5, 19:00

Draw 15
April 6, 09:00

Draw 16
April 6, 14:00

Draw 17
April 7, 19:00

Playoffs

Brackets

1 vs. 2 game
April 7, 14:00

3 vs. 4 game
April 7, 19:00

Semi-final
April 8, 13:00

Final
April 9, 12:30

Round robin player percentages

References
General
 
Specific

World Men's Championship
World Men's Curling Championship
International curling competitions hosted by the United States
World Men's Curling Championship
World Men's Curling Championship
Curling in Massachusetts
World Men's Curling Championship
International sports competitions hosted by the United States
Sports competitions in Lowell, Massachusetts